Paralimosina is a genus of flies belonging to the family Lesser Dung flies.

Species
P. acris Roháček & Papp, 1988
P. albipes Hayashi, 1994
P. altimontana (Roháček, 1977)
P. atrimarginata Hayashi, 2008
P. biloba Hayashi, 1994
P. bracteata Roháček & Papp, 1988
P. brevis Roháček & Papp, 1988
P. cavata Hayashi, 1994
P. ceylanica (Papp, 1979)
P. choochotei Hayashi, 2008
P. confusa Hayashi, 1994
P. dimorpha Roháček & Papp, 1988
P. fucata (Rondani, 1880)
P. gigantea Roháček & Papp, 1988
P. hamata Hayashi, 2008
P. icaros Roháček & Papp, 1988
P. indica Roháček & Papp, 1988
P. japonica Hayashi, 1985
P. kaszabi Papp, 1973
P. kinabalensis Hayashi, 2007
P. lobata Roháček & Papp, 1988
P. longitricha Hayashi, 2008
P. macedonica (Roháček, 1977)
P. maculipennis Hayashi, 2008
P. marshalli Roháček & Papp, 1988
P. megaloba Hayashi, 1994
P. minor Roháček & Papp, 1988
P. pallens Hayashi, 2008
P. persimilis Hayashi, 2008
P. prominens Hayashi, 1985
P. sexsetosa (Papp, 1982)
P. similis Hayashi, 1994
P. subcribrata (Roháček, 1977)
P. trichopyga (Richards, 1952
P. undulata Hayashi, 2008

References

Sphaeroceridae
Diptera of Asia
Diptera of Africa
Diptera of Europe
Brachycera genera